Robert Simpson (1886 - January 7, 1934) was a writer and editor.

Early life 
In 1886, Simpson was born in Strathy, Scotland. Simpson's father was Robert Simpson and his mother was Mary Ann Smith Simpson.

Career 
In about 1905, Simpson started working in the palm-oil business, trading with West Africa.

In 1907, Simpson emigrated to the United States. In 1916, Simpson became an editor at the Frank A. Munsey Company.  In 1917, Simpson was promoted to managing editor of The Argosy, and stayed in that role for three years.  He left in 1920 to become a free-lance writer, and returned to editing in 1925, becoming the editor of Mystery Magazine.

Simpson's novels include The Bite of Benin, Swamp Breath, The Grey Charteris, Eight Panes of Glass, and Calvert of Allobar.

Personal life 
Simpson was married to Marie A. Simpson, née Socin, and they had a daughter and two sons.

References

1886 births
1934 deaths
Scottish writers
American writers
American editors
British emigrants to the United States